Charles Franklin "Honey" Honaker (October 11, 1899 – April 21, 1974) was a professional American football player, who played in five games in the early National Football League (NFL), for the Cleveland Bulldogs in 1924. He was a member of the Bulldogs 1924 NFL Championship team. Prior to his professional career, he played at the college level for Virginia Military Institute and the Ohio State Buckeyes, where he lettered for the team in 1921, 1922 and 1923. In 1921, he was given the nickname "Honey" by the Buckeyes fans. According to an October 7, 1922 game program between Ohio State and Ohio Wesleyan University, Honaker's hometown was Russell, Kentucky.

References
 Ohio Wesleyan-Ohio State Football October 7, 1922

External links
 

1899 births
1974 deaths
American football ends
American football halfbacks
Cleveland Bulldogs players
Ohio State Buckeyes football players
People from Greenup County, Kentucky
Sportspeople from Huntington, West Virginia
Players of American football from Kentucky